Joshua Cushman (April 11, 1761 – January 27, 1834) was a U.S. Representative from Massachusetts and from Maine. Born in Halifax in the Province of Massachusetts Bay, Cushman served in the Continental Army from April 1, 1777, until March 1780. He was graduated from Harvard University in 1787, studied theology, was ordained to the ministry and licensed to preach. He was pastor of the Congregational Church in Winslow, Maine for nearly twenty years. He served in the Massachusetts State Senate, and served as member of the Massachusetts House of Representatives.

Cushman was elected as Democratic-Republican from Massachusetts to the Sixteenth Congress (March 4, 1819 – March 3, 1821). When the State of Maine was admitted into the Union, he was also elected as a Democratic-Republican member to the Seventeenth Congress, and reelected as an Adams-Clay Republican to the Eighteenth Congress (March 4, 1821 – March 3, 1825). He died in Augusta, Maine on January 27, 1834. He was interred in a tomb on the State grounds in Augusta.

Notes

References

1761 births
1834 deaths
Massachusetts state senators
Members of the Massachusetts House of Representatives
Members of the United States House of Representatives from Maine
Harvard College alumni
American Congregationalists
Massachusetts Democratic-Republicans
Maine Democratic-Republicans
Maine National Republicans
People from Halifax, Massachusetts
Politicians from Augusta, Maine
People from Winslow, Maine
Continental Army soldiers
Democratic-Republican Party members of the United States House of Representatives from the District of Maine
National Republican Party members of the United States House of Representatives from Massachusetts